Curry Todd is a Republican member of the Tennessee House of Representatives for the 95th District, encompassing part of Shelby County.

Biography
Curry Todd was born on December 31, 1947, in Juno, Tennessee. He is a graduate of the University of Memphis.

He is a member of the National Rifle Association. He also serves as state chairman and is a member of the board of directors of the American Legislative Exchange Council (ALEC), a national association of legislators. He worked as a police officer in Memphis.

He is divorced with one child. He is a Baptist.

In 2010, he compared pregnant illegal immigrants to reproducing rats, though he later apologized.

Arrest
In October 2011, he was arrested with a DUI. He apologized to Gov. Bill Haslam. A few days later, he resigned from his chairmanship of the State and Local Government Committee. Chip Forrester, the Chair of the Tennessee Democratic Party, called for his resignation.

Second Arrest
He pled guilty to DUI and possessing a loaded firearm. He was sentenced to 48 hours in jail, one year of probation, fined, given community service, alcohol training, an alcohol car locking device and ordered to participate in MADD treatments. (2011)

In 2016, Todd was arrested for stealing campaign signs supporting his opponent, Mark Lovell. Lovell posted Todd's $100 bond.

References

1947 births
Living people
Basketball players from Tennessee
Republican Party members of the Tennessee House of Representatives
Memphis Tigers men's basketball players
Parade High School All-Americans (boys' basketball)
21st-century American politicians
American men's basketball players
Tennessee politicians convicted of crimes